The Communauté de communes de la Morinie is a former intercommunality in the Pas-de-Calais département, in northern France. It was created in January 1994. It was merged into the Communauté d'agglomération du Pays de Saint-Omer in January 2017.

Composition
It comprised the following 8 communes:

Bellinghem
Clarques
Delettes
Ecques
Heuringhem
Mametz
Rebecques
Thérouanne

References 

Morinie